The Immortal Life of Henrietta Lacks is a drama television film directed by George C. Wolfe and starring Oprah Winfrey and Rose Byrne. It is based on the book of the same name by Rebecca Skloot and documents the story of Henrietta Lacks, who was diagnosed with cervical cancer in the 1950s, and whose cancer cells (later known as HeLa) would change the course of cancer treatment. The film premiered on HBO on April 22, 2017.

Cast

Oprah Winfrey as Deborah Lacks
Rose Byrne as Rebecca Skloot
Renée Elise Goldsberry as Henrietta Lacks
Courtney B. Vance as Sir Lord Keenan Kester Cofield
Reg E. Cathey as Zakariyya Lacks
Ruben Santiago-Hudson as Dr. Pattillo
Leslie Uggams as Sadie
Reed Birney as Dr. George Gey
John Douglas Thompson as Lawrence Lacks
Adriane Lenox as Barbra Lacks
Roger Robinson as Day Lacks
Rocky Carroll as Sonny Lacks
Kyanna Simone Simpson as Teenage Deborah Lacks

Production
The film was announced on May 2, 2016 with Alan Ball and Oprah Winfrey as executive producers. George C. Wolfe would direct the film, with Winfrey taking the role of Lacks' daughter Deborah. In July, Rose Byrne was cast as Rebecca Skloot, the author of the book about Henrietta, who befriends Deborah while reporting on her mother's life, and Renée Elise Goldsberry was cast as the titular Henrietta Lacks. The core supporting cast was rounded out in August 2016, with Courtney B. Vance, Ruben Santiago-Hudson, Reg E. Cathey and Leslie Uggams amongst them. After several weeks of shooting in Atlanta, The Immortal Life of Henrietta Lacks began filming in Baltimore in September, 2016. Two of Henrietta Lacks's sons, Zakariyya and Sonny, were consultants on the film.

Reception

Critical reception
The Immortal Life of Henrietta Lacks received mixed to positive reviews from critics, with Winfrey's performance gaining high praise. The review aggregator website Rotten Tomatoes gave the film an approval rating of 65%, based on 31 reviews, with an average rating of 6.5/10. On Metacritic the film has a score of 64 out of 100, based on 22 critics, indicating "generally favorable reviews".

Accolades

References

External links
 

2017 films
American drama films
Drama films based on actual events
HBO Films films
Films based on non-fiction books
Films directed by George C. Wolfe
Films with screenplays by Peter Landesman
Films shot in Georgia (U.S. state)
Films shot in Maryland
2010s American films